The Capu Tafunatu is a mountain in the department of Haute-Corse on the island of Corsica, France.
Located in the Monte Cintu massif near the Paglia Orba, it rises southeast of Manso on the edge of the commune of Albertacce.

Capu Tafunatu literally means "perforated head".

Geology
Capu Tafunatu consists of alkaline rhyolite with ignimbrite facies, an igneous rock of the Monte Cinto annular volcano-plutonic complex, formed in the Permian.

The formation of the "hole" is explained by tectonics.
The inclined plane at the base of this cavity is an oblique fault which, intersecting the rocky blade of the summit, weakened it and caused it to collapse.

In popular culture
Georges-Louis Leclerc, Comte de Buffon (1707–1788), in Histoire et théorie de la terre (History and Theory of the Earth), hypothesizes that Corsica is a mountain peak of the sunken continent of Atlantis. 
It was at this time that this legend was told:

Access

All require great caution (risk of fatal falls) but remain practicable without special equipment for people in good physical condition and not prone to vertigo.

The normal route "ranks at the upper limit of what non-climbers can face".
It begins at the Moorish Pass and uses a system of low-sloping rocky outcrops (vires) that run on the east face of Capu Tafunatu: first to the south and then over whitish rocks, heading north to the plateau where the cavity opens.

Climbing

Access to the main summit of Capu Tafunatu, altitude , requires "PD (peu difficile) sup." climbing skills, a rate that indicates "small difficulties [...] requiring the use of the rope" ).
From the platform on the east face where the "hole" opens, a ledge crosses the north ridge, then returns to the west face towards a chimney (vertical fracture, listed II) which is climbed  up to near the summit ridge, to finish with a short climb (vertical slab, grade III) to the summit.

Several climbing routes rated “AD” (Assez difficile: Fairly difficult) to “TD" (Très difficile: Very difficult) climb the east and west faces. 
Their approach is respectively from the Col des Maures and the Fango valley.

Gallery

Notes

Sources

Mountains of Haute-Corse